Eremophila purpurascens, commonly known as purple eremophila, is a flowering plant in the figwort family, Scrophulariaceae and is endemic to Western Australia. It is an erect, bushy shrub with warty leaves and spotted, pink to red flowers.

Description
Eremophila purpurascens is an erect shrub with many tangled branches. Many of its branches arise from ground level and the leaves smell like camphor when crushed. The branches have persistent raised leaf bases, prominent glands and are glabrous and often sticky due to the presence of resin.

The flower buds are yellow with purple spots but when the flower opens, the petal tube is light pinkish-purple with darker purple spots on the outside of the tube and the inside of the lower petal lobe. The inside of the tube is yellow. The four stamens extend slightly beyond the end of the petal tube.

Taxonomy and naming 
This species was first formally described by Robert Chinnock in 1979 and the description was published in Journal of the Adelaide Botanic Garden. The specific epithet (purpurascens) is derived from the Latin word purpureus meaning "purple" with the suffix -escens meaning "becoming" referring to the sepals which become more purplish as they age.

Distribution and habitat
Purple eremophila is found on rocky hills near Norseman, Western Australia, in the Coolgardie biogeographic region.

Conservation
Eremophila purpurascens is classified as "Priority Three" by the Western Australian Government Department of Parks and Wildlife, meaning that it is poorly known and known from only a few locations but is not under imminent threat.

Use in horticulture
The thick, heart-shaped leaves and pinkish-purple flowers of this shrub are its main attractions. It can be propagated easily from cuttings and grows well in a range of soils, including clay. It is a hardy garden shrub requiring little or no watering, even during a long drought, and is very frost hardy.

References

External links 
 

Eudicots of Western Australia
purpurascens
Endemic flora of Western Australia
Plants described in 1979
Taxa named by Robert Chinnock